The 2011 Atlantic Coast Conference baseball tournament was held at the Durham Bulls Athletic Park in Durham, North Carolina, from May 25 through 29. All of the games were shown live on Fox Sports South with select games being shown on Fox Sports Florida, Comcast Mid-Atlantic, Sun Sports, and New England Sports Network. Top seeded Virginia won the tournament and earned the Atlantic Coast Conference's automatic bid to the 2011 NCAA Division I baseball tournament. It was Virginia's third ACC tournament win and second in three years.

2011 was the fifth year in which the conference used a round-robin tournament format, with the team with the best record in each group at the end of the three-game round robin advancing to a one-game championship.

Seeding

Tournament

Notes
† - Denotes extra innings
‡ - Denotes game shortened due to mercy rule

Results

Division A

Division B

Championship final

All-Tournament Team

See also
College World Series
NCAA Division I Baseball Championship

References

Tournament
Atlantic Coast Conference baseball tournament
Atlantic Coast Conference baseball tournament
Atlantic Coast Conference baseball tournament
Baseball competitions in Durham, North Carolina
College baseball tournaments in North Carolina